The Irish film industry produced over forty feature films in 2014. This article fully lists all non-pornographic films, including short films, that had a release date in that year and which were at least partly made by the Republic of Ireland. It does not include films first released in previous years that had release dates in 2014. Nor does it include films made by Northern Ireland, which are included in List of British films of 2014.  Also included is an overview of the major events in Irish film, including film festivals and awards ceremonies, as well as lists of those films that have been particularly well received, both critically and financially.

Major releases

Deaths

See also

 2014 in film
 2014 in Ireland
 Cinema of Ireland
 List of Irish submissions for the Academy Award for Best Foreign Language Film

References

External links

Irish
Films
Lists of Irish films
English-language films
Irish-language films